Snow Hill is a town in Greene County, North Carolina, United States. The population was 1,595 at the 2010 census. It is the county seat of Greene County and is part of the Greenville Metropolitan Area.  Snow Hill hosts numerous tennis tournaments during the year.  Snow Hill is home to the Green Ridge Racquet Club.  Many junior players and adults travel to Snow Hill in order to play in the USTA (United States Tennis Association) Sanctioned tournaments.

History
In its early history, Snow Hill was near the location of the final major battle of the Tuscarora War at Fort Neoheroka in 1713. There are several theories for the derivation of the town's name. One theory is that the town derived its name from the Contentnea Creek on whose banks Native Americans camped and called them "snowy white," which was translated into "snowy hills." It snows rarely, however, so the snowy white is more likely a reference to the white sands along the creek. Another theory was described by McLoud in the Goldsboro newspaper as being "loblolly pine is in water," and the most recent translation from the Tuscarora language offered was "as fish go by."

Originally a community in central Greene County, the town of Snow Hill was chartered in 1828. The town almost became the capital of North Carolina and was originally a major trading depot on Contentnea Creek. At the time, Contentnea Creek was a main Wilson-to-New Bern trading artery. Contentnea Creek connects with the Neuse River at Kinston.

It is believed Snow Hill is the smallest town in the United States to ever field a professional baseball team. From 1937-40, the Snow Hill Billies played in the Class D Coastal Plain League and won the league pennant in 1937. Future New York Yankees Aaron Robinson and Al Gettel began their careers with the Billies, as did Walter Rabb, who would serve as head baseball coach at the University of North Carolina at Chapel Hill for nearly thirty years.

In April 2011, a tornado struck the town and caused massive damage.

The Greene County Courthouse, Neoheroka Fort Site, Snow Hill Colored High School, Snow Hill Historic District, and St. Barnabas Episcopal Church are listed on the National Register of Historic Places.

Geography
U.S. Route 13 passes through the north side of town, leading northeast  to Greenville and southwest  to Goldsboro. U.S. Route 258 passes through the center of town, leading north  to Farmville and south  to Kinston.

Demographics

2020 census

As of the 2020 United States census, there were 1,481 people, 760 households, and 480 families residing in the town.

2010 census
As of the 2010 United States Census, there were 1,595 people living in the town. The racial makeup of the town was 52.6% Black, 36.3% White, 0.2% Native American, 1.1% Asian, 0.1% from some other race and 1.1% from two or more races. 8.7% were Hispanic or Latino of any race.

2000 census
As of the census of 2000, there were 1,514 people, 627 households, and 381 families living in the town. The population density was 1,286.8 people per square mile (495.4/km2). There were 683 housing units at an average density of 580.5 per square mile (223.5/km2). The racial makeup of the town was 48.81% African American, 47.03% White, 0.40% Native American, 0.07% Asian, 2.97% from other races, and 0.73% from two or more races. Hispanic or Latino of any race were 3.30% of the population.

There were 627 households, out of which 23.9% had children under the age of 18 living with them, 38.0% were married couples living together, 18.7% had a female householder with no husband present, and 39.2% were non-families. 36.5% of all households were made up of individuals, and 17.4% had someone living alone, who was 65 years of age or older. The average household size was 2.20 and the average family size was 2.85.

In the town, the population was spread out, with 18.9% under the age of 18, 8.7% from 18 to 24, 23.3% from 25 to 44, 24.4% from 45 to 64, and 24.6% who were 65 years of age or older. The median age was 44 years. For every 100 females, there were 81.1 males. For every 100 females age 18 and over, there were 74.9 males.

The median income for a household in the town was $25,795, and the median income for a family was $29,213. Males had a median income of $25,625 versus $20,556 for females. The per capita income for the town was $15,904. About 15.3% of families and 20.5% of the population were below the poverty line, including 24.1% of those under age 18 and 26.5% of those age 65 or over.

Education
Schools in Snow Hill are administered by the Greene County Public School system. The six schools include Greene Central High School, Greene Early College High School, Greene County Middle School, Greene County Intermediate School, Snow Hill Primary School and West Greene Elementary School. Higher education is provided through nearby East Carolina University or community colleges located in Goldsboro, Greenville and Kinston.

Transportation
The closest airport to Snow Hill is Pitt-Greenville Airport  with service to Charlotte Douglas International Airport, although most residents use Raleigh-Durham International Airport for domestic and international travel.

Highways that run through the city include US 13, US 258, NC 903, NC 58 and NC 91.

Notable people
Donald G. Davis, member of the North Carolina Senate
Rapsody, rapper
Ray E. Eubanks, US Army paratrooper and Medal of Honor recipient in World War II
Cliff Godwin, college baseball head coach
Petey Pablo, rapper
Mule Shirley, Major League Baseball first baseman

References
Notes

External links
 Town of Snow Hill official website
 Contentnea Development Partnership - Non Profit Economic Development Company Serving Snow Hill and Greene County NC

Towns in Greene County, North Carolina
Towns in North Carolina
County seats in North Carolina
Greenville, North Carolina metropolitan area
Populated places established in 1811